Adam Bell was a legendary English outlaw. He and his companions William of Cloudsley and Clym of the Clough lived in Inglewood Forest near Carlisle and were figures similar to Robin Hood. Their story is told in Child Ballad 116 entitled Adam Bell, Clym of the Cloughe  and Wyllyam of Cloudeslee.  The basis of the tale has historical roots in the criminal activities of the Folville and Coterel gangs. At one point William of Cloudsley, who is famed as an archer, shoots an arrow through an apple on his son's head at six score paces, a feat also ascribed to William Tell and other heroes.  The oldest printed copy of this ballad dates from 1505 and was printed by Wynkyn de Worde.  There are notable parallels between this ballad and that of Robin Hood and the Monk, but whether either legend was the source for the other cannot be established.

In the prologue to Howard Pyle's 1883 novel The Merry Adventures of Robin Hood, Little John upon first meeting Robin favorably compared Robin's skill at archery to that of Adam Bell.

Adam Bell is the chief protagonist of the penny dreadful novel by Pierce Egan the Younger entitled Adam Bell, or, The Archers of Englewood published in 1842.

Adam Bell is thought to be the "Adam" mentioned by Shakespeare in Much Ado About Nothing, I, i, 257-9:

...hang me in a bottle like a cat, and shoot at me, and he that hits me, let him be clapp'd on
 the shoulder, and call'd Adam.

Adam Bell was played by Bryan Marshall in the Robin of Sherwood episode Adam Bell. In this particular storyline, Bell sacrifices his life so that Robin can rescue the Sheriff of Nottingham's nephew Martin from his murderous uncle.

References and footnotes

External links
Text of the ballad
Book - Outlaws of Inglewood : 'The Story of Adam Bell, Clym of the Clough and William of Cloudesley.'.

Alternate source for ballad text

Child Ballads
Legendary English people
English outlaws
Robin Hood
Cumbrian folklore
Northumbrian folklore
Inglewood Forest